Tight junction protein are proteins that are involved in the formation and functioning of tight junctions; "Tight junction protein" may refer to:
TJP1, Tight junction protein 1 (ZO-1)
TJP2, Tight junction protein 2 (ZO-2)
TJP3, Tight junction protein 3 (ZO-3)

See also
 Gap junction protein